"Drop Dead Gorgeous" is a song by English alternative rock band Republica. Released in 1996 on their self-titled debut album and in 1997 as the album's third and final single from the album, it was as a commercial success, giving the group their only top 10 hit to date in the UK. The single elicited a positive critical reaction, and was also a minor hit in the US, New Zealand, and Germany. The music video, which went into rotation on MTV, was nominated for "Best Video" at the 1998 Brit Awards.

Reception

Critical
The song was praised upon its release. AllMusic's Stephen Thomas Erlewine praised the song as one of its parent album's highlights, and felt that the song has a "bright, energetic sound that is quite infectious."

Commercial
The song was a success in the United Kingdom and United States. In the UK, the song gave the group their only top-10 hit to date. The single debuted at number 7 on the UK Singles Chart on the week beginning 3 May 1997; the single spent a total of seven consecutive weeks on the chart, more than any other song by the group. The following year, the song was also successful in the US, entering the Billboard Hot 100 and peaking at number 93, spending a total of three weeks on the chart. The single also entered the Billboard Modern Rock Tracks chart, where it entered the top 40 and peaked at number 39. Elsewhere, "Drop Dead Gorgeous" peaked at number 30 in New Zealand and number 90 in Germany.

Music video
The song's music video was nominated for "Best Video" at the 1998 Brit Awards. It also went into rotation on MTV.

Legacy
The song was included on Official Charts' list of "20 Classic Hits Turning 20 Years Old in 2017," with writer Justin Meyers noting that both "Ready to Go" and "Drop Dead Gorgeous" "still get played on ads or on TV pretty often."

Track listing
Adapted from AllMusic.
 "Drop Dead Gorgeous" — 3:32
 "Out of this World" — 7:05
 "Mutha" — 4:00
 "Holly" — 7:07

Personnel
Adapted from AllMusic.
 Donald Christie — photography
 Ben Grosse — mixing, production, programming
 Randy Jacobs — guitar
 Saffron — vocals
 Michael Tuller — programming
 John Vitale — guitar, programming
 Jez Williams — guitar

Charts

References

External links
 Hear the song on YouTube

1995 songs
1997 singles
Deconstruction Records singles
Republica songs